Lophodermium is a genus of fungi within the family Rhytismataceae. The genus contains 145 species and has a global distribution. Species of this genus are usually observed producing zone lines, conidiomata and ascomata on dead fallen leaves, but at least some are known to colonize living leaves. In many cases they then live inside the colonized leaf as a symptomless endobiont, where they are regarded as detritivores utilising dead plant matter. In a few cases they may kill all or part of the leaf prematurely, and there is a substantial literature dealing with those species as plant pathogens. The genus infects many different plant families but with a notable concentration in the family Pinaceae; many Lophodermium species are restricted to a single host genus (or even species), but some, particularly those infecting grasses, may infect several genera. Some are economically important plant pathogens, such as those that cause needlecast disease in European Black Pine, Scots Pine and Red Pine in forestry and christmas tree plantations. In these species, notably L. pinastri and L. seditiosum, the fungal spores disperse and infect the pine needles in late summer, which turn brown by the following spring and then fall off.

Partial list of species
A selection of species is listed below with their principal hosts:
Lophodermium abietis. Host: Picea (often included in L. piceae)
Lophodermium apiculatum. Host: Poaceae
Lophodermium arundinaceum. Host: Poaceae
Lophodermium aucupariae. Host: Sorbus
Lophodermium australe. Host: Pinus
Lophodermium autumnale. Host: Abies
Lophodermium baculiferum. Host: Pinus
Lophodermium caricinum. Host: Carex
Lophodermium chamaecyparissi. Host: Juniperus
Lophodermium conigenum. Host: Pinus
Lophodermium consociatum. Host: Abies
Lophodermium culmigenum. Host: Poaceae
Lophodermium decorum. Host: Abies
Lophodermium durilabrum. Host: Pinus
Lophodermium exaridum. Host: Pyrola
Lophodermium festucae. Host: Poaceae
Lophodermium foliicola. Host: Rosaceae, particularly Crataegus
Lophodermium gramineum. Host: Poaceae
Lophodermium herbarum. Host: Convallaria
Lophodermium hypophyllum. Host: Vaccinium
Lophodermium hysterioides. Host: Amelanchier
Lophodermium indianum. Host: Pinus
Lophodermium intermissum. Host: Andromeda
Lophodermium juniperinum. Host: Juniperus
Lophodermium lacerum. Host: Abies
Lophodermium laricinum. Host: Larix
Lophodermium macci. Host: Pinus subgenus Strobus
Lophodermium maculare. Hosts: Arctostaphylos, Vaccinium
Lophodermium melaleucum. Host: Vaccinium
Lophodermium molitoris. Host: Pinus
Lophodermium nanakii. Host: Picea
Lophodermium nitens. Host: Pinus
Lophodermium oxycocci. Host: Vaccinium
Lophodermium paeoniae. Hosts: Paeonia
Lophodermium petiolicola. Hosts: Castanea, Quercus
Lophodermium piceae. Host: Abies (L. abietis often considered synonymous)
Lophodermium pinastri Hosts: Larix, Pinus
Lophodermium pini-excelsae Host: Pinus subgenus Strobus
Lophodermium pini-mugonis Host: Pinus mugo
Lophodermium pyrolae. Host: Pyrola
Lophodermium rubicola. Host: Rubus
Lophodermium schweinitzii. Hosts: Gaultheria, Rhododendron
Lophodermium seditiosum Host: Pinus
Lophodermium sphaerioides. Host: Rhododendron
Lophodermium thuyae. Host: Thuja
Lophodermium typhinum. Host: Typha
Lophodermium uncinatum. Host: Abies

References

External links 
 Lophodermium at Index Fungorum

Leotiomycetes
Fungal plant pathogens and diseases